Barazna or Borozna (Belarusian: Баразна, Russian: Борозна) is a gender-neutral Belarusian surname that may refer to
Dzmitry Barazna (born 1973), Belarusian football player
Katsiaryna Barazna (born 1990), Belarusian track cyclist

Belarusian-language surnames